Burmese in Thailand constitute Thailand's largest migrant population. According to the 2014 Myanmar Census, 1,418,472 former Burmese residents, including 812,798 men and 605,674 women, were living in Thailand, constituting about 70% of Burma's overseas population. Burmese in Thailand tend to fall into three categories: professional migrants working in the business or professional sectors, laborers working in low-skilled professions, and refugees fleeing conflict.

Migrant workers tend to hold low-skilled jobs in the fishing and seafood processing, construction, garment, and domestic service industries. Macquarie University estimates that the average annual remittances from Thailand to Burma exceed . The movement of Burmese nationals into Thailand began in the 1970s, following the 1962 Burmese coup d'état and resulting economic decline from implementation of the Burmese Way to Socialism, and ongoing civil conflicts. Burmese migrants contribute tremendously to the Thai economy, contributing between 5 and 6.2% of Thailand's GDP.

Samut Sakhon province is home to Thailand's largest Burmese migrant community, representing about 200,000 Burmese migrants. Other large Burmese communities reside in Mae Sot, Ranong,

In 2003, the Thai and Burmese governments signed a memorandum of understanding to formally recognize this labor migration flow and legalize migration through a government program to recruit workers directly from Burma, and to use a nationality verification process whereby migrant workers receive a temporary passport, an identity certificate, a visa to remain in Thailand for two years, and a change of work status to legal.

There are also roughly 150,000 Burmese refugees living at 9 official camps on the Thai–Burmese border. The largest such camp is Mae La refugee camp. In 2014, the Thai government announced plans to repatriate Burmese refugees who have been living in border camps for the past 2 decades.

See also
Myanmar–Thailand relations

References

External links
Myanmar Migrants to Thailand: Economic Analysis and Implications for the Development of Myanmar

Ethnic groups in Thailand